The Hunted is a 2003 American action thriller film directed by William Friedkin and starring Tommy Lee Jones, Benicio del Toro, and Connie Nielsen.

Plot
U.S. Army Sergeant First Class Aaron Hallam, a former Delta Force operator, has spent much of his career performing covert assassinations and black operations for the U.S. government. He is awarded the Silver Star for his service in the Kosovo War, but is left wracked with PTSD from the atrocities he witnessed.

In the wilderness of Silver Falls State Park, Oregon, Hallam encounters two hunters equipped with expensive scoped rifles. Hallam tells them that, due to their use of guns and scopes, they are not "true hunters". Insulted, the hunters pursue him, but are overwhelmed by Hallam's tactics and traps and are killed.

L.T. Bonham, a former civilian instructor of military survival and combat training, lives secluded deep in the woods of British Columbia. He is approached by the FBI, who ask him to help apprehend Hallam, one of his former students. Bonham agrees and joins the FBI task force pursuing Hallam, led by Assistant Special Agent in Charge Abby Durrell. Bonham discovers Hallam's personal effects in a tree and encounters Hallam. As the two of them fight, Hallam is struck by an FBI tranquilizer and taken into custody.

During his interrogation, Hallam is uncooperative and looks mainly to Bonham, who he views as a father figure. The FBI, unsure what to do, hand him to the custody of his fellow JSOC operators, who tell the FBI that Hallam cannot stand trial due to the classified operations he had participated in. While being transported, the operators indicate that they intend to kill Hallam to ensure his silence; Hallam manages to kill all the operatives and escape.

Alerted to the incident, Bonham and the FBI search for Hallam. Bonham finds him at the house of his ex-girlfriend and her daughter in Portland, but he flees after Abby arrives to apprehend him. Pursued by the FBI and the Portland Police Bureau, Hallam ambushes and kills pursuing FBI agents in a sewer and attempts to board a streetcar to blend in. The police block the bridge the streetcar is on, and he dives off the bridge, fleeing upstream.

Resurfacing up the river, Hallam crafts a knife out of reclaimed metal, as Bonham taught him. Meanwhile, Bonham crafts his own knife out of stone and enters the wilderness alone in search of Hallam. Bonham is caught by one of Hallam's traps and is thrown down a waterfall. Surviving, he meets Hallam at the bottom, and they engage in hand-to-hand combat. The two sustain severe injuries, and Bonham's knife is broken, but Bonham manages to gain the upper hand and stab Hallam with his own knife, killing him as Abby and the FBI arrive.

Bonham, mostly recovered, returns to his home in British Columbia. He starts to burn Hallam's letters, in which he expressed his concerns over the things he witnessed during his service.

Cast
 Tommy Lee Jones as L.T. Bonham 
 Benicio del Toro as Sergeant Aaron Hallam 
 Connie Nielsen as FBI Special Agent Abby Durrell 
 Leslie Stefanson as Irene Kravitz 
 John Finn as FBI Special Agent Ted Chenoweth 
 José Zúñiga as FBI Special Agent Bobby Moret 
 Ron Canada as FBI Special Agent Harry Van Zandt 
 Mark Pellegrino as Dale Hewitt 
 Jenna Boyd as Loretta Kravitz 
 Aaron DeCone as Stokes (as Aaron Brounstein) 
 Carrick O'Quinn as Kohler 
 Lonny Chapman as Zander 
 Rex Linn as Powell, The Hunter 
 Eddie Velez as Richards, The Hunter 
 Alexander MacKenzie as Sheriff
 Johnny Cash as The Narrator (uncredited)

Production
The film was partially filmed in and around Portland, Oregon and Silver Falls State Park. Portland scenes were filmed in Oxbow Park, the South Park Blocks, the Columbia Blvd Treatment Plant, and Tom McCall Waterfront Park. The technical adviser for the film was Tom Brown Jr., an American outdoorsman and wilderness survival expert. The story is partially inspired by a real-life incident involving Brown, who was asked to track down a former pupil and Special Forces sergeant who had evaded capture by authorities. This story is told in Tom's book, Case Files Of The Tracker. Chapter 2 of this book, "My Frankenstein," describes Brown's tracking and fight with a former special operations veteran.

The hand-to-hand combat and knife fighting in the film featured Filipino Martial Arts. Thomas Kier and Rafael Kayanan of Sayoc Kali were brought in by Benicio del Toro. They were credited as knife fight choreographers for the film.

Reception

Box office
The box office for the film was less than its reported production budget of $55 million. The Hunted opened on March 14, 2003 at #3 in 2,516 theaters across North America and grossed $13.48 million during its opening weekend. It went on to gross $34,244,097 in North America and $11,252,437 internationally markets for a worldwide total of $45,496,534.

Buena Vista International handles the distribution in Argentina, Australia, Belgium, Netherlands and parts of Latin America.

Columbia TriStar Film Distributors International handles Finnish & Swedish theatrical distribution through its then distribution partner Nordisk Film.

In United Kingdom - Redbus Film Distribution handles distribution under the name Helkon SK. It was released on 6th June 2003 (despite being renamed to Redbus on 6th May 2003).

Critical response
The overall critical reaction to the movie was negative. It scored a "Rotten" 29% rating on Rotten Tomatoes based on 148 reviews.

Many reviewers noted striking similarities to First Blood, with which this film was unfavorably compared. Rolling Stone called it "Just a Rambo rehash." While there was some praise for the cinematography and the action scenes, much criticism was directed at the thin plot and characterization, and the general implausibility. Rex Reed of the New York Observer called it a "Ludicrous, plotless, ho-hum tale of lurid confrontation." The UK magazine, Total Film said the film was "scarcely exciting to watch."

However, the film also received praise from other high profile critics, particularly for the fact it kept the special effects and stunts restrained. For example, Roger Ebert said, "We've seen so many fancy high-tech computer-assisted fight scenes in recent movies that we assume the fighters can fly. They live in a world of gravity-free speed-up. Not so with Friedkin's characters." He reviewed the film on his own site and scored it 3 1/2 out of 4 stars. Time Out London was also positive saying, "Friedkin's lean, mean thriller shows itself more interested in process than context, subtlety and character development pared away in favour of headlong momentum and crunching set pieces."

References

11. Case Files of the Tracker, Tom Brown Jr., 2003, Berkley Publishing.

External links
 Official site
 
 
 
 
 

2003 films
2003 action thriller films
2003 crime thriller films
2000s survival films
American action thriller films
American chase films
American crime thriller films
American survival films
American thriller drama films
2000s English-language films
Films about Delta Force
Films about the Federal Bureau of Investigation
Films about hunters
Films directed by William Friedkin
Films produced by James Jacks
Films scored by Brian Tyler
Films set in the 1990s
Films set in 2003
Films set in Kosovo
Films set in Oregon
Films set in Portland, Oregon
Films set in Serbia
Films shot in Oregon
Films shot in Portland, Oregon
Lakeshore Entertainment films
Paramount Pictures films
Yugoslav Wars films
Works about the Kosovo War
2000s American films